Mass Effect 2 is an action role-playing video game developed by BioWare and released for Microsoft Windows and Xbox 360 in 2010, and for PlayStation 3 in 2011. The game features a variety of downloadable content (DLC) packs that were released from January 2010 to May 2011. The downloadable content ranges from single in-game character outfits to entirely new plot-related missions. Notable packs include Kasumi – Stolen Memory, Overlord, Lair of the Shadow Broker, and Arrival. The game's downloadable content was generally well received by critics and some packs were nominated for Best DLC at the Spike Video Game Awards.

New purchases of the game are provided with a one-time use card granting access code that unlocks the game's Cerberus Network, an online downloadable content and news service that enables free bonus content for the game. However, users who buy the game used have to pay for the Cerberus Network separately if they want access to the bonus content. Some downloadable content packs were originally only available for the Microsoft Windows and Xbox 360 versions of Mass Effect 2 through limited promotional opportunities. These were then made available on the PlayStation Network when the game was released for the PlayStation 3. In 2021, all of the Mass Effect 2 downloadable content was remastered as part of the Mass Effect Legendary Edition.

Narrative packs

Weapon and armor packs

Appearance packs

Notes

References

External links
 

Mass Effect 2
Mass Effect downloadable content